Krommenie-Assendelft is a railway station in Krommenie and Assendelft, Netherlands. The station lies on the Den Helder–Amsterdam railway, and was opened on 1 November 1869. The station had a goods yard, but no longer does. The station had remained unchanged since 1975 until 2006. The station began being moved in 2006, further west, closer to the Saendelft estate. This new station opened on 14 December 2008.

Train services
The following train services call at Krommenie-Assendelft:
2× per hour local service (sprinter) Uitgeest – Zaandam – Amsterdam – Woerden – Rotterdam (all day, every day)
2× per hour local service (sprinter) Uitgeest – Zaandam – Amsterdam – Utrecht – Rhenen (only on weekdays until 8:00 PM)

Bus services
Bus services serving the station are operated by Connexxion.
 63 (Krommenie-Assendelft Station – Assendelft – Westzaan – Koog a/d Zaan – Zaandam – Zaandam Hospital – Zaandam Kogerveld – Zaandam Kalf)
 69 (Krommenie-Assendelft Station – Krommenie – Wormerveer – Zaandam)
 414 (Krommeniedijk – Krommenie – Station – Wormerveer – Wormer – Oost-Knollendam) Buurtbus service
 N61 (Krommenie-Assendelft Station – Wormerveer – Zaandijk – Koog a/d Zaan – Zaandam) Niteliner service
 N63 (Zaandam Town Centre – Zaandam Station – Koog a/d Zaan – Westzaan – Assendelft – Krommenie-Assendelft Station) Niteliner service

External links
NS website 
Dutch Public Transport journey planner 
Connexxion website 

Railway stations in North Holland
Railway stations opened in 1869
Railway stations on the Staatslijn K
1869 establishments in the Netherlands
Railway stations in the Netherlands opened in the 19th century